Iodine monochloride is an interhalogen compound with the formula . It is a red-brown chemical compound that melts near room temperature.  Because of the difference in the electronegativity of iodine and chlorine, this molecule is highly polar and behaves as a source of I+.

Preparation 
Iodine monochloride is produced simply by combining the halogens in a 1:1 molar ratio, according to the equation

When chlorine gas is passed through iodine crystals, one observes the brown vapor of iodine monochloride. Dark brown iodine monochloride liquid is collected. Excess chlorine converts iodine monochloride into iodine trichloride in a reversible reaction:

Polymorphs
 has two polymorphs; α-ICl, which exists as black needles (red by transmitted light) with a melting point of 27.2 °C, and β-ICl, which exists as black platelets (red-brown by transmitted light) with a melting point 13.9 °C.

In the crystal structures of both polymorphs the molecules are arranged in zigzag chains. β-ICl is monoclinic with the space group P21/c.

Reactions and uses
Iodine monochloride is soluble in acids such as HF and HCl but reacts with pure water to form HCl, iodine, and iodic acid:

 + O2
 + O2

ICl is a useful reagent in organic synthesis.  It is used as a source of electrophilic iodine in the synthesis of certain aromatic iodides.  It also cleaves C–Si bonds.

ICl will also add to the double bond in alkenes to give chloro-iodo alkanes.
RCH=CHR′ + ICl → RCH(I)–CH(Cl)R′
When such reactions are conducted in the presence of sodium azide, the iodo-azide RCH(I)–CH(N3)R′ is obtained.

The Wijs solution, iodine monochloride dissolved in acetic acid, is used to determine the iodine value of a substance.

It can also be used to prepare iodates, by reaction with a chlorate. Chlorine is released as a byproduct.

Iodine monochloride is a Lewis acid that forms 1:1 adducts with Lewis bases such as dimethylacetamide and benzene.

References

Iodine compounds
Chlorides
Interhalogen compounds
Diatomic molecules
Oxidizing agents